Diego de Losada y Cabeza de Vaca (1511 – 1569) was a Spanish conquistador and the founder of Santiago de León de Caracas, the current capital of Venezuela.

Losada was born in Rionegro del Puente, in what is now the province of Zamora. He reached Puerto Rico in 1533.

Losada founded Caracas in 1567 after defeating Tamanaco, the Mariche chief. He died two years later, at  Borburata.

References

1511 births
1569 deaths
People from the Province of Zamora
Colonial Venezuela
Spanish explorers
Spanish city founders
16th-century Spanish people
Spanish conquistadors